Torquigener pallimaculatus, commonly known as the rusty-spotted toadfish, is a fish of the pufferfish family Tetraodontidae native to the Indian Ocean and northern Australia.

References

External links
 Fishes of Australia : Torquigener pallimaculatus

pallimaculatus
Marine fish of Northern Australia
Marine fish of Western Australia
rusty-spotted toadfish